Jumilla Club de Fútbol was a Spanish football team based in Jumilla, Region of Murcia. Founded in 1975 and dissolved in 2011, it held home games at Estadio Municipal de La Hoya, with a 3,000-seat capacity.

History
Jumilla was founded in 1975. On 27 May 2011, immediately after having finished its only season in Segunda División B - after 24 years in Tercera División, 20 consecutive - the club was dissolved due to an overall debt of €370,000.

Season to season

1 season in Segunda División B
24 seasons in Tercera División

References

External links
Official website 
Futbolme team profile 

Association football clubs established in 1975
Association football clubs disestablished in 2011
Defunct football clubs in the Region of Murcia
1975 establishments in Spain
2011 disestablishments in Spain